Durus kura (or simply Durus) is a traditional fried chicken curry, one of the most significant dishes in the Rohingya and Chittagonian cuisine, which is basically skinless whole chicken cooked in a thick broth. Duroos is typically popular for guests during weddings and other events in Chittagong and Arakan. Duroos can be served with polao or khichuri. Chicken is called kura or kuro in the Rohingya and Chittagonian language, from which the name derives.

Ingredient 
 Skinless whole chicken, 
 salt, 
 turmeric paste, 
 green chilli and dry red chilli paste, 
 cumin paste, 
 coriander paste, 
 garam masala paste, 
 ginger paste, 
 garlic paste and 
 onion paste.

Process 
The whole chicken should be cleaned and washed well and the two sides of the chicken breast should be pierced and the legs should be bent. All the spices should be mixed well throughout the body. Then in a pan on stove, mixture of onion paste, ginger paste, garlic paste, green chilli paste, turmeric powder, cumin powder, salt, poppy seed paste, coconut paste, almond paste, bay leaf and water need to be poured with the whole chicken. After that, covering with a lid it's required to cook for 20 minutes. After 20 minutes, removing from the pan the lid should be opened. Later, it's required to put oil in another pan on the stove. When the oil is hot, the boiled chicken should be fried well on both sides. After that, the boiled chicken masala pan should be kept on the oven, mixed the powdered milk with garam masala powder. Then it needs to stir with the boiled chicken, and cover it to cook for another 5 minutes. At the end, when it turns red, it has to be taken down.

References

See also 
 List of chicken dishes
 List of meat dishes
 Chicken curry

Meat dishes
Bangladeshi cuisine
Chittagonian cuisine
Chicken dishes